The 1955 French motorcycle Grand Prix was the second round of the 1955 Grand Prix motorcycle racing season. It took place on 15 May 1955 at the Reims-Gueux circuit.

500 cc classification

350 cc classification

125 cc classification

References

French motorcycle Grand Prix
French
Motorcycle Grand Prix